Allenhurst was a community in Brevard County. The town was demolished and residents were forced to move after the building of the Kennedy Space Center along with 12 other communities.

References 

Geography of Brevard County, Florida
Ghost towns in Florida